The women's shot put event at the 1969 European Indoor Games was held on 9 March in Belgrade.

Results

References

Shot put at the European Athletics Indoor Championships
Shot